Ronald Pereira Martins (born 14 June 2001), simply known as Ronald, is a Brazilian footballer who plays as a forward for Estrela da Amadora, on loan from Grêmio Anápolis.

Club career
Born in Corumbá, Mato Grosso do Sul, Ronald began his career with hometown side Corumbaense. He made his first team debut at the age of 17 on 2 February 2019, coming on as a second-half substitute in a 2–0 Campeonato Sul-Mato-Grossense away win against Operário de Dourados.

Ronald scored his first senior goal on 16 February 2019, netting his team's third in a 3–1 home win against Aquidauanense. He also spent a period on a trial at Atlético Mineiro before signing for the under-20 side of Atlético Goianiense.

Ronald started to appear in the first team of Dragão in January 2021, but was loaned to Grêmio Anápolis on 24 February 2021, until the end of the Campeonato Goiano. After helping the latter side win the competition for the first time ever with two goals (one of them against his parent club) in 14 appearances, he signed a permanent deal with Grêmio Anápolis and subsequently returned to Atlético for the Série A, on loan.

Ronald made his debut in the main category of Brazilian football on 30 May 2021, starting in 1–0 away win against Corinthians.

Career statistics

Honours
Grêmio Anápolis
Campeonato Goiano: 2021

References

External links
Futebol de Goyaz profile 

2001 births
Living people
Sportspeople from Mato Grosso do Sul
Brazilian footballers
Association football forwards
Campeonato Brasileiro Série A players
Campeonato Brasileiro Série D players
Corumbaense Futebol Clube players
Atlético Clube Goianiense players
Grêmio Esportivo Anápolis players
Guarani FC players